A Man and His Music – Part II is a 1966 television special starring Frank Sinatra, accompanied by the orchestras of Nelson Riddle and Gordon Jenkins, and also featuring Nancy Sinatra.

It was the sequel to the previous years special A Man and His Music. It was followed up by A Man and His Music + Ella + Jobim in 1967.

Tracks
"Fly Me to the Moon"
"The Most Beautiful Girl in the World"
"Moonlight In Vermont"
"You're Nobody 'til Somebody Loves You"
Nancy Sinatra: "Bang Bang (My Baby Shot Me Down)"
Nancy Sinatra: "On Broadway"
Duet with Nancy: "Yes Sir, That's My Baby"
Duet Medley with Nancy: "Downtown"/"These Boots Are Made for Walkin'"
Medley: "Just One of Those Things"/"My Heart Stood Still"/"But Beautiful"/"When Your Lover Has Gone"
"Luck Be a Lady"
"That's Life"
"Granada"
"My Kind of Town"
"Put Your Dreams Away (For Another Day)"

References

External links

1960s American television specials
1966 television specials
Frank Sinatra television specials
NBC television specials
Television shows directed by Dwight Hemion